Body & Soul is a live album by pianist Tete Montoliu recorded in 1971 and released on the German label, Enja in 1983.

Reception

Ken Dryden of AllMusic said "This 1971 live date comes from a Munich nightclub, with a respectfully audience that saves its raucous applause until the conclusion of each number. ... highly recommended".

Track listing
 "Sweet Georgia Fame" (Blossom Dearie) – 8:09
 "Old Folks" (Dedette Lee Hill, Willard Robison) – 5:56	
 "Blues" (Tete Montoliu) – 6:11
 "A Nightingale Sang in Berkeley Square" (Eric Maschwitz, Manning Sherwin) – 7:25
 "Body and Soul" (Johnny Green) – 8:04
 "Lament" (J. J. Johnson) – 4:46

Personnel
Tete Montoliu – piano
George Mraz – bass
Joe Nay – drums

References

Tete Montoliu live albums
1983 live albums
Enja Records live albums